Who Needs Guitars Anyway? is the first and only album by Alice Deejay, released on 28 March 2000. It includes the hit singles "Back In My Life", "Better Off Alone", "Will I Ever", "The Lonely One", and "Celebrate Our Love". The album debuted in the top 100 of the Billboard 200 album sales chart in the United States in 2000 and remained in this chart into 2001. The songs "The Lonely One", "Will I Ever" and "Celebrate Our Love" are different versions from the single versions and video versions that were released.

Track listing

Charts

Certifications

References

2000 debut albums
Alice Deejay albums